Sergey Rusin (born 31 October 1959) is a former freestyle swimmer from the Soviet Union. He competed at the 1980 Summer Olympics in Moscow, USSR, and is best known for winning the gold medal in the men's 400 m freestyle at the 1977 European Championships in Sweden.

References
 

1959 births
Living people
Russian male freestyle swimmers
Soviet male freestyle swimmers
Swimmers at the 1980 Summer Olympics
Olympic swimmers of the Soviet Union
Place of birth missing (living people)
World Aquatics Championships medalists in swimming
European Aquatics Championships medalists in swimming
Universiade medalists in swimming
Universiade gold medalists for the Soviet Union
Universiade silver medalists for the Soviet Union
Medalists at the 1979 Summer Universiade